Ziya Müezzinoğlu (1919–2020) was a Turkish economist, diplomat and politician. He held various posts, including ambassador of Turkey to West Germany and minister of finance.

Early life and education
Müezzinoğlu was born in Kayseri on 5 May 1919. He was educated at the Faculty of Political Science, Ankara University.

Career
After his graduation in 1942 Müezzinoğlu joined at the Ministry of Finance where he first worked in the Finance Inspection Board. He became an inspectorate of finance in 1946. Between 1959 and 1960 he served as the director general of the treasury. Following the military coup on 27 May 1960 he was elected to the Constituent Assembly. In 1962 he was appointed undersecretary of the State Planning Organization which he held until 1964 when he was named as the ambassador of Turkey to West Germany. From January 1967 he served as the permanent representative of Turkey at the European Economic Community. The same year he also became the representative of Turkey at the European Coal and Steel Union and the European Atomic Energy Community.

On 22 May 1972 Müezzinoğlu was appointed finance minister to the cabinet led by Prime Minister Ferit Melen and remained in office until 1973. Following the military intervention of Turkey in Cyprus Müezzinoğlu was named as the head of the Coordination Council in August 1974. The council was designed to reorganization of the region under Turkish administration. Müezzinoğlu was in office until July 1975. He was elected to the Turkish Senate for the Republican People's Party in 1975 from his hometown, Kayseri. In 1977 he was appointed minister of commerce to the second cabinet of Bülent Ecevit. His term was very brief, but he was again appointed minister of finance next year and served in the cabinet headed by Ecevit. He was in office until 1979.

Later years, personal life and death
Following his retirement from politics in 1990 Müezzinoğlu involved in the establishment of several foundations, including Türkiye Ekonomik ve Sosyal Etütler Vakfı (Turkish: Turkish Economic and Social Studies Foundation), Çağdaş Demokrasi Vakfı (Turkish: Contemporary Democracy Foundation) and Türkiye–Avrupa Vakfı (Turkish: Foundation of Turkey–Europa)

He was married and had two children.

Müezzinoğlu died in Antalya on 13 June 2020. He was buried at the Kötekli Belen cemetery in Antalya on 15 after the funeral prayers.

References

External links

20th-century Turkish diplomats
20th-century Turkish economists
1919 births
2020 deaths
Ministers of Finance of Turkey
Republican People's Party (Turkey) politicians
People from Kayseri
Ankara University Faculty of Political Sciences alumni
Members of the 35th government of Turkey
Members of the 40th government of Turkey
Members of the 42nd government of Turkey
Ambassadors of Turkey to West Germany
Members of the Constituent Assembly of Turkey
Members of the Senate of the Republic (Turkey)
Turkish centenarians
Men centenarians